Robert Charles Ducksworth Jr. (born January 5, 1963) is a former American football defensive back in the National Football League who played for the New York Jets. He played college football for the Southern Miss Golden Eagles.

Ducksworth was a quarterback at Southern Miss.

References

1963 births
Living people
American football quarterbacks
American football defensive backs
New York Jets players
Southern Miss Golden Eagles football players
Biloxi High School alumni